The Council of the Haida Nation ("CHN") (X̱aaydaG̱a Waadlux̱an Naay) is the elected government of the Haida Nation. The council consists of a president and vice-president elected by popular vote, twelve regional representatives from four electoral regions, and one appointed representative from each of the Old Massett Village Council and Skidegate Band Council.

The Haida Nation is engaged in a legal title dispute regarding their territories, the islands of Haida Gwaii and surrounding waters, asserting that the Crown has never legally acquired title to these areas, and has illegally infringed upon Haida Title and rights within the territories through the imposition of Canadian sovereignty and the extraction of resources under Canadian authority. There are two main Haida villages on Haida Gwaii: G̱aaw, known in English as Old Massett, and Hlg̱aagilda, known in English as Skidegate. Haida populations in Kxeen and T'agwan are also represented on the Council of the Haida Nation. The CHN recognizes the separate jurisdiction of the Kaigani Haida, in southern Alaska, who are members of the Haida Nation, but are governed by the Central Council of the Tlingit and Haida Indian Tribes of Alaska.

All Haida territories were in the past also claimed by Russia and Spain as well as the United States. Once Russian and Spanish claims to Haida Gwaii were given up in treaties with Britain and the United States, the islands continued to be claimed by the United States until the British claim to them was formalized by the creation of the Colony of the Queen Charlotte Islands in 1853. Russian claims to Kaigani Haida territory were sold to the United States in 1867 with the Alaska Purchase.

The Council, formed in 1974, has been involved in many conflicts over the fate of its territories, which have been part of Canada since 1871, and by the Colony of British Columbia and the Colony of the Queen Charlotte Islands prior to that. No treaties between the Crown and the governments of the Haida were ever signed, as in most of the rest of the current Canadian province of British Columbia.

The Constitution of the Haida Nation was accepted formally in 2003.

Environment 
The Haida Gwaii archipelago is one of the richest marine and terrestrial environments on earth. The Haida people are a product of their environment; thus their culture is an emanation of respect and gratitude for their provider, the land and sea. The archipelago consists of over 200 islands and is located off the coast of British Columbia, Canada.

The Haida Nation encompasses the Haida Gwaii archipelago and surrounding water. This includes the Dixon Entrance, half of the Hecate Strait, half the distance to Vancouver Island, and westward from the land toward the Pacific Ocean.

Mandate 
The Mandate is an order for the Council of the Haida Nation. The Council follows the Mandate to the best of their abilities.

The Mandate acknowledges the following:
 The Council must care for the lands and waters of the Nation area.
 The Council must preserve the language and culture of the Haida people.
 The Council must aim for independence of the Haida Nation.
 The Council must serve the best interests of the Nation in ways that align with the Constitution.
 The Council must encourage co-existence with other Nations, yet maintain the policies and interests of the Haida Nation.
 The Council must aim to improve the rights of all Indigenous peoples.
 The Council must create land policies which account for the resources available within the land.
 The Council must regulate citizen access to land resources.
 The Council must designate process for land use which account for the resources available within Haida Gwaii.
 The Council must deal with any external affairs within the Haida Nation.
 The Council must be the defence for the Haida Nation.
 The Council must update Haida citizens quarterly at formal meetings. This excludes any necessarily confidential information.
 The Vice President must advertise for the Council quarterly meetings at least seven days in advance to the meeting date.
 The Council must record meetings.
 The Council have the official publication as "Haida Laas".

Languages 
The constitution acknowledges the Haida language (X̱aad Kil and X̱aayda Kil) and English as the official languages of the Haida Nation.

Governance 
The House of Assembly is a legal form of Haida National government. This group has the right to pass laws which align with the Constitution of the Haida Nation. The House of Assembly meet yearly with the Council of the Haida Nation. These meetings occur in October during the third week of the month. Each yearly meeting alternates between G̱aaw (Old Masset) and Hlg̱aagilda (Skidegate). In addition to the House of Assembly meetings, the Council of the Haida Nation meet quarterly with Haida citizens.

The Vice President calls the House of Assembly meeting twenty days before the meeting date. They may also call other meeting dates if required, again, at least twenty days before the scheduled date. All motions placed through the House of Assembly can only be approved by a vote of three-quarter approval or more.

Secretariat 
The Council of the Haida Nation sustains a Secretariat. The duties of the Secretariat are as follows: the Secretariat answers to both the House of Assembly and the Council of the Haida Nation, the Secretariat acts as Treasurer and will manage the staff of the Council of the Haida Nation, and the Secretariat has multiple rights to the credit of the Council of the Haida Nation.

Subsidiary bodies (Village Councils) 
The Village Councils are concerned with the well-being of the communities and Band members. The Village Councils may initiate laws.

Skidegate Band Council 
Chief Councillor: Billy Yovanovich

Councillors: Duane Alsop, Lyndale George, David Crosby, Michelle McDonald, Trent Moraes, Michelle Pineault, Robert Russ.

Old Masset Village Council 
Chief Councillor: Donald (Duffy) Edgars

Councillors: V. Freda Davis (Deputy), Lisa White, Cecil Brown, Patrika McEvoy, Robert Brown, Brodie Swanson, Jade Collison, .

Citizenship 
The Haida citizenship act was approved on 31 May 2017. When accepted as a Haida Nation citizen, one receives both a Card and a Certificate. The card is used for identification purposes, and the certificate is the official citizenship document. The Constitution of the Haida Nation states that the title of Haida Gwaii Citizen may be given to an individual who does not have Haida ancestry. This title does not include receiving Haida indigenous rights or Haida heritage claims.

References

External links 
 Haida Nation 
 Skidegate Band Council 
 Council of the Haida Nation page on Skidegate Band Council  bad link.
 Council of the Haida Nation - Forest Guardians
 British Columbia Treaty Commission

Haida governments
Organizations established in 1974
1974 establishments in British Columbia